Heracleium or Herakleion was a town of ancient Ionia.

Its site is located above Kavaklı, Asiatic Turkey.

References

Populated places in ancient Ionia
Former populated places in Turkey